The 2014–15 season was the 47th season of the Northern Premier League Premier Division, and the eighth season of the Northern Premier League Division One North and South. 
The league sponsors for 2014–15 were Evo-Stik.

Premier Division

The Premier Division featured six new teams:
Belper Town, promoted via play-offs from NPL Division One South
Curzon Ashton, promoted as champions of NPL Division One North
Halesowen Town, promoted as champions of NPL Division One South
Ramsbottom United, promoted via play-offs from NPL Division One North
Stourbridge, transferred from the Southern League Premier Division
Workington, relegated from Conference North

League table

Play-offs

Semi-finals

Final

Results

Stadia and locations

Division One North

Division One North featured four new teams:
Brighouse Town, promoted as champions from the Northern Counties East League Premier Division
Spennymoor Town, promoted as champions from the Northern League Division One
Droylsden, relegated from the NPL Premier Division
Scarborough Athletic, transferred from the NPL Division One South

League table

Play-offs

Semi-finals

Final

Results

Stadia and locations

Division One South

Division One South featured five new teams:
Norton United, promoted as champions from the North West Counties League Premier Division
Spalding United, promoted as champions from the United Counties League Premier Division
Tividale, promoted as champions from the Midland Alliance
Stafford Rangers, relegated from the NPL Premier Division
Stocksbridge Park Steels, relegated from the NPL Premier Division

League table

Play-offs

Semi-finals

Final

Results

Stadia and locations

Challenge Cup

The 2014–15 Northern Premier League Challenge Cup is the 45th season of the Northern Premier League Challenge Cup, the main cup competition in the Northern Premier League. It will be sponsored by Doodson Sport for a fourth consecutive season. 68 clubs from England will enter the competition, beginning with the preliminary round on 1 September, and all ties will end will end after 90 minutes and conclude with penalties.

The defending champions are AFC Fylde, who defeated Skelmersdale United 1–0 in the 2014 Final. Fylde will be unable to defend their title as they were promoted to the Conference North through the play–offs.

Calendar

Preliminary round
Eight teams from the Northern Premier League Division One North or Northern Premier League Division One South have to compete in the Preliminary round to win a place in the competition proper. The draw for this round was made on 23 July 2014.

Source:

First round
Teams that were not in the preliminary round from Northern Premier League Division One North or Northern Premier League Division One South entered at this stage as well as teams from the Northern Premier League Premier Division, along with the winners from the preliminary round. The draw for this round was made on 23 July 2014.

Source:

Second round
The 32 winners from the first round were entered into the second round draw on 19 November 2014. The ties are originally scheduled to be played between 2 and 3 December.

Source:

Third round
The 16 winners from the second round were entered into the third round draw on 4 December 2014. The ties are originally scheduled to be played between 12 and 20 January.

Source:

Quarter-finals
The 8 winners from the third round were entered into the Quarter-final draw on 20 January 2015. The ties are originally scheduled to be played between 17 and 25 February.

Source:

Semi-finals
The 4 winners from the Quarter-finals were entered into the Semi-final draw on 18 February 2015. The ties are originally scheduled to be played between 24 March and 8 April.

Source:

Final
The Challenge Cup Final was played at Edgeley Park, the home ground of Stockport County. This was Farsley's first final appearance and the second final appearance for Warrington Town (they advanced to the final in 1993 but were defeated by Winsford United). This was the first final in which both teams were from lower divisions.

Source:

See also
Northern Premier League
2014–15 Isthmian League
2014–15 Southern League

References

External links
Official website

Northern Premier League seasons
7